Risod Assembly constituency is one of the 288 constituencies of Maharashtra Vidhan Sabha (Legislative Assembly) and one of the three which are located in the Washim district.

Risod is part of the Akola Lok Sabha constituency along with five other Vidhan Sabha segments, namely Akot, Balapur, Akola West, Akola East and Murtizapur, from Akola district.

Members of Legislative Assembly

Election Results

2019

See also
 Risod
 List of constituencies of Maharashtra Vidhan Sabha

References

Assembly constituencies of Maharashtra
Washim district